The electoral district of Flinders was an electoral district of the Legislative Assembly in the Australian state of Queensland.

It was first created in 1887, effective 1888, covering the area centred on the central Queensland towns of Cloncurry, Richmond and Hughenden. It replaced the Electoral district of Burke. Flinders, along with parts of Burke, was incorporated into the new seat of Carpentaria in the 1931 redistribution, effective in 1932. It was abolished in a redistribution in 1991, effective 1992. Most of its territory became part of Charters Towers, while the western portion, including Cloncurry, became part of Mount Isa. The last sitting member for Flinders was Bob Katter, who had held it since December 1974.

Members for Flinders

Election results

See also
 Electoral districts of Queensland
 Members of the Queensland Legislative Assembly by year
 :Category:Members of the Queensland Legislative Assembly by name

References

Former electoral districts of Queensland
Constituencies established in 1888
1888 establishments in Australia
Constituencies disestablished in 1932
1932 disestablishments in Australia
Constituencies established in 1950
1950 establishments in Australia
Constituencies disestablished in 1992
1992 disestablishments in Australia